70th meridian may refer to:

70th meridian east, a line of longitude east of the Greenwich Meridian
70th meridian west, a line of longitude west of the Greenwich Meridian